One Month To Live: Thirty Days To A No Regrets Life is a book by Woodlands Church pastor Kerry Shook and his wife Chris Shook. It was published on February 5, 2008, by WaterBrook Press, a division of Random House. It was a New York Times bestseller.

References

External links 
 One Month to Live
 Kerry Shook Ministries
 Fellowship of The Woodlands

2008 non-fiction books